Dmytro Rudyk (born 26 August 1992), is a professional Ukrainian football goalkeeper who played for FC Oleksandriya in the Ukrainian Premier League.

He is the product of FC Ametyst Oleksandria sportive school and was born in the teachers family. From 2011 he plays in FC Olekdandriya and was promoted to the Ukrainian Premier League together with team.

References

External links 
 
 

1992 births
Living people
People from Oleksandriia
Ukrainian footballers
FC Oleksandriya players
Association football goalkeepers
Ukrainian Premier League players
Sportspeople from Kirovohrad Oblast